The Church of Santa María (Spanish: Iglesia de Santa María) is a church located in Cogolludo, Spain. The church was constructed from 1545 to 1609.

It was declared Bien de Interés Cultural in 1996.

References 

Bien de Interés Cultural landmarks in the Province of Guadalajara
Roman Catholic churches in Castilla–La Mancha
16th-century Roman Catholic church buildings in Spain
Roman Catholic churches completed in 1609
Renaissance architecture in Spain
1609 establishments in Spain
Churches in the Province of Guadalajara